Ibrahim Aziz (born 1959) is an Emirati sprinter. He competed in the men's 4 × 400 metres relay at the 1984 Summer Olympics.

References

1959 births
Living people
Athletes (track and field) at the 1984 Summer Olympics
Emirati male sprinters
Emirati male middle-distance runners
Olympic athletes of the United Arab Emirates
Place of birth missing (living people)